Xiagezhuang Town is a town located inside of Pinggu District, Beijing, China. It is situated near the alluvial plain of Ju River. The town shares border with Shandongzhuang Town in the north, Nandulehe Town in the east, Xujiatai Village and Duanjialing Town in the south, Donggaocun Town in the southwest, as well as Pinggu Town and Xinggu Subdistrict in the northwest. It was home to 26,185 inhabitants as of 2020. 

The name Xiagezhuang refers to Xiagezhuang Village, where the town's government is located.

History

Administrative divisions 
So far in 2021, Xiagezhuang Town has direct jurisdiction over 18 subdivisions, with 3 of them being communities and 15 of them being villages. They are, by the order of their Administrative Division Codes:

See also 

 List of township-level divisions of Beijing

References 

Pinggu District
Towns in Beijing